Attila Grandpierre (born 4 July 1951) is a Hungarian musician, astrophysicist, physicist, self-taught historian, writer and poet. He is best known as leader/vocalist of the Galloping Coroners rock band.

Personal ideology 
From his childhood on he was very interested in dealing with the Sun and the cosmos. As an adult he is looking for the answer whether the Universe does have a physical, biological or psychological nature.

Life

Ancestry 
Grandpierre's family name comes from French Huguenot ancestors, according to family tradition, with some French bishops, of whom one, Louis Grandpierre, was a Swiss politician and president of the Swiss Appeal Court, and another, Károly Grandpierre, a writer and consultant of Lajos Kossuth, settled in Hungary.

Young years, family 
Grandpierre was born in Hungary under the Soviet regime on 4 July 1951 in Budapest. His father, Endre Grandpierre K. was a writer and historian. His father's studies on history greatly influenced the small Attila. He was five years old when he stated that he wanted to become an astronomer, dealing with the Sun, and seven years old when he stated that he wanted to become a singer. He graduated at ELTE as a physicist-astronomer in 1974, and got his Ph.D. in 1977.

Physicist career
He studied theoretical biology focused on Ervin Bauer's works. In 2009 his subject field of interest concerned the relation between astronomy and civilization. During 1995-1998 he worked with Professor Ervin László studying the physics of collective consciousness and the quantum-vacuum interactions. In 2011 he was an invited professor on Computational Biology at the Chapman University, California for six months.

As physicist he had a strong interest in the problem of bringing the sciences and metaphysics together. He paid special attention to interdisciplinal science and complexity of living systems in 2008.

Books 
As a physicist, Grandpierre published 10 books, 3 book chapters, more than 70 science and over 300 popular science papers.

He wrote the Fundamental Complexity Measures of Life and Cosmic Life Forms chapters in the book titled From Fossils to Astrobiology (2008, Springer).

He was co-editor of the book Astronomy and Civilization in the New Enlightenment (2011, Springer).

Important publications 
In astrophysics he wrote an article on the variable nature of the Sun's core, which was mentioned in New Scientist in 2007.

Working with Katalin Martinás, he wrote on "natural" thermodynamics.

He formulated a mathematical principle of biology as published in the fringe journal NeuroQuantology in 2007.

Musician career 
As a musician Atilla Grandpierre is best known as leader/vocalist of Galloping Coroners (Vágtázó Halottkémek in Hungarian) rock band and later the same of acoustic Galloping Wonder Stag from 2005.

By his high school years, before he had started to sing, he had a certain degree of countrywide fame among youngsters as a mysterious, unconventional boy who did crazy things with his friends, e.g. creating homemade rockets.

References

Hungarian scientists
Hungarian rock musicians
1951 births
Alternative Tentacles artists
Living people
Quantum physicists
Hungarian people of French descent